Telemark is a county in Norway, the name originally referred to Upper Telemark.

Telemark may also refer to:

Telemark cattle, an old Norwegian breed of cow
Telemark Battalion, a Norwegian Army Mechanized Infantry unit
Telemark skiing, a skiing technique
 Telemark landing, a ski jumping technique
Telemark Lodge in northern Wisconsin
The Telemark Operation, a World War II covert mission for Norwegian heavy water sabotage
The Heroes of Telemark, a 1965 film about the sabotage
Telemark (waltz), a ballroom dance step
TeleMark, an EEMBC embedded computing performance benchmark